The Delaware Fightin' Blue Hens men's basketball team is the basketball team that represents University of Delaware in Newark, Delaware. The school's team currently competes in the National Collegiate Athletic Association (NCAA) at the Division I level as a member of the Colonial Athletic Association since 2001. Home games are played at the Acierno Arena at the Bob Carpenter Center.

Notre Dame assistant coach Martin Ingelsby was named head coach May 24, 2016, replacing Monté Ross.

Postseason results
In eight appearances in postseason tournaments, the Fightin' Blue Hens have not won a postseason game.

NCAA tournament results
The Fightin' Blue Hens have appeared in the NCAA tournament six times. Their combined record is 0–6. As a member of the CAA, Delaware won the 2014 CAA tournament to earn the conference's bid to the NCAA tournament.

NIT results
The Fightin' Blue Hens have appeared in the National Invitation Tournament (NIT) one time. Their record is 0–1.

CBI results
The Fightin' Blue Hens have appeared in the College Basketball Invitational (CBI) one time. Their record is 0–1.

Fightin' Blue Hens in international leagues
 Steve Schlachter (born 1954), American-Israeli basketball player in the Israeli Basketball Premier League
 John Gordon (born 1976), Delaware native, played for the Blue Hens from 1998 to 2000. He was a national runner up for the Naismith Men's College Basketball Player of the Year for Mid-Major. Gordon was inducted into the Delaware Basketball Hall of Fame on March 13, 2013. Additionally, Gordon played pro-basketball in the National Basketball League in Sydney, Australia.

See also
Delaware Fightin' Blue Hens women's basketball

References

External links